Hailie Rochelle Deegan (born July 18, 2001) is an American professional stock car racing driver. She competes full-time in the NASCAR Craftsman Truck Series, driving the No. 13 Ford F-150 for ThorSport Racing. Deegan is currently a Ford Performance driver and formerly a Toyota Racing Development driver.

Deegan grew up racing off-road and on dirt, but transitioned to competing on asphalt in 2016 to pursue a career in stock car racing. She began her career in NASCAR in 2018 in the NASCAR K&N Pro Series West. She became the first female driver to have won races in the West Series, doing so in the 2018 and 2019 seasons. She is the daughter of Brian Deegan.

Off-road racing

Deegan began riding dirt bikes at age seven, and started competing in short course off-road racing after being gifted a Trophy Kart for her eighth birthday. In 2009, she won in her first race in the SXS Stadium Series' Trophy Kart class. She also raced in the Lucas Oil Off Road Racing Series (LOORRS) Junior 1 Karts' final two races at Primm Valley Motorsports Complex. In 2013, she became the first female driver to win a LOORRS championship when she won the Junior 2 Karts class. Deegan became the Modified Kart Regional Champion in 2015 and became the Modified Kart National Champion the following year. She was also named 2016 Lucas Oil Off Road Driver of the Year. Deegan continued to race full-time in the Pro Lite division of the Lucas Oil Off Road Racing Series in 2017. She is one of four women to win a LOORRS class championship in its history alongside Corry Weller, Kali Kinsman, and Megan Mitchell.

After moving to pavement racing, Deegan occasionally returned to off-road. In December 2021, she participated in the Nitro Rallycross' side-by-side (SXS) support class at Florida International Rally and Motorsports Park, where she finished fifth and fourth in two races. When the Truck Series had a weekend off on March 11–13, 2022, Deegan made her Mint 400 debut in the Unlimited Truck Spec class.

Asphalt racing
In 2016, Deegan began her transition to asphalt racing by driving legends cars for Rev Racing. In 2017, she made her asphalt late model debut with a pair of CARS Super Late Model Tour starts, first at Tri-County Motor Speedway, and later at Hickory Motor Speedway.

NASCAR
Deegan was a NASCAR Drive for Diversity member in 2016, and she received the NASCAR Diversity Young Racer award the following year. In May 2017, Deegan was one of nine drivers named to the 2017 NASCAR Next class, in which she was both the youngest member and the only woman. She also became a member of Toyota's driver development program.

2018: K&N Pro Series, first victory

On January 3, 2018, Deegan was announced as a full-time driver in the NASCAR K&N Pro Series West for Bill McAnally Racing (BMR), a team that had won the West Series championship each of the three previous seasons. It was announced that she would also run a part-time schedule for McAnally in the NASCAR K&N Pro Series East. Deegan was the only female driver who competed full-time in either 2018 K&N Series. Deegan made her debut in the season-opening East Series race at New Smyrna Speedway on February 11, where she started ninth but retired on lap 19 due to mechanical problems. On March 15, Deegan made her West Series debut at Kern County Raceway Park, finishing seventh. Kevin Harvick, NASCAR's 2014 Sprint Cup Series champion (who finished fourth), battled for position with Deegan at the end of the race and was impressed with her performance, saying, "If I had to pick one person to say, 'Alright, that's the person [Kevin Harvick Incorporated] would want to represent and has the most potential,' it would probably be Hailie Deegan. She did really, really well." On May 15, Deegan was announced as a NASCAR Next class member for the second straight year as one of four drivers returning to the program from the previous season. Among those in the 2018–19 class, she was once again the only woman as well as the youngest member. She scored her first career top-five finish on May 19, finishing fourth at Orange Show Speedway.

At Sonoma, Deegan qualified third and received her high school diploma during driver introductions. She went on to finish seventh in the race, earning her sixth top-ten finish in six West Series races. In her next race at Roseburg, Deegan finished second behind her BMR teammate, Derek Kraus, setting a new mark for her best career finish in the series and tying Kenzie Ruston, Nicole Behar, and Julia Landauer (all of whom are also NASCAR Next alumni) for the record for best K&N Pro Series finish by a woman.

At the Dirt Track at Las Vegas Motor Speedway, Deegan qualified on pole position for the Star Nursery 100, becoming the first woman in NASCAR history to win a pole at the K&N level. Despite a shifter issue during the first half of the race, she led 13 laps and equalled her career best result of second in the event. On September 29, Deegan became the first woman to win at the K&N Pro Series level, taking the victory at the NAPA Auto Parts Idaho 208 at Meridian Speedway in Idaho. Deegan passed her BMR teammate Cole Rouse on the final lap, which ended up being the only lap she led throughout the race. Her win was the second for a woman in a NASCAR touring series race, the first being Shawna Robinson's one win in the 1980s in the now-defunct NASCAR Dash Series. With a sixth-place finish two races later at the K&N West season finale at Kern County, Deegan closed the year by clinching Rookie of the Year honors for the series.

2019: Return to K&N competition, ARCA debut

Deegan returned to BMR in 2019 for another full and partial schedule in the K&N West and East Series respectively. At the East season-opening race at New Smyrna, qualifying was rained out, allowing Deegan to inherit pole position after setting the fastest practice time. Deegan led the first six laps but eventually retired from the race, finishing 16th after suffering a mechanical issue at New Smyrna for the second consecutive year. Prior to the 2019 season, the Dirt Track at Las Vegas Motor Speedway's race date was moved to serve as the season-opening race for the West Series. Deegan earned her second career K&N Pro Series win in the event with another last-lap pass, this time on Sunrise Ford Racing's Jagger Jones.

On March 1, 2019, Deegan announced plans to compete in six races for Venturini Motorsports in the ARCA Menards Series. Deegan made her series debut at Toledo in Venturini's No. 55 Toyota Camry on May 19. She ranked 12th in both practice and qualifying, finishing 18th and last after being involved in a crash with Joe Graf Jr. At Colorado National Speedway, Deegan earned her third career K&N West win, though some deemed the victory controversial as she spun out Kraus, her teammate, for the win on the final lap. Deegan took pole position at the following race in Sonoma, though she never led a lap in the race and finished eighth after late-race contact with teammate Lawless Alan.

In August, Deegan made her debut for the DGR-Crosley team at the second K&N East race at Bristol. Despite having originally announced the race as part of her schedule with Venturini, she confirmed she would run the event for DGR in their No. 54 Toyota Camry. At the combined East and West Series race at Gateway later that month, Deegan struggled and only managed a ninth-place finish while also sparking an argument with series veteran Todd Souza. Deegan and Souza made contact late in the race, with Souza calling her driving "disrespectful."

Deegan scored her first ARCA top-five finish in October at Indianapolis Raceway Park. The following weekend, she had a strong performance at Roseville in K&N West, setting the fastest time in both practice sessions, winning the pole, and finishing second in the race. Deegan ended the 2019 season with a fourth-place finish at ISM Raceway, clinching third in the final championship point standings.

2020: Move to Ford and DGR-Crosley, Truck debut
Deegan switched from Toyota's development driver program to Ford's at the end of 2019, signing a full-time ARCA Menards Series contract with DGR-Crosley, which themselves had announced a move to Ford the previous week. She cited Toyota's lack of available teams relative to their number of drivers as the reason for the switch, explaining, "there's so many Toyota drivers and there's not many seats. I think we made the best decision for my career long-term." Deegan's father Brian stated that she would focus on ARCA in 2020 to prepare her for the higher levels of NASCAR.

At the season-opening race at Daytona International Speedway, Deegan ran the fastest lap time in the opening practice session. Despite a mid-race incident with Chuck Hiers, she would go on to finish second in the race behind Michael Self, tying Robinson and Erin Crocker for best ARCA finish by a woman. She followed with three consecutive seventh-place finishes before finishing third at Lucas Oil Raceway, tying the series record for best finish by a woman on a short track. Deegan would not score another top-five finish until Lebanon I-44 Speedway, where she finished fifth after being involved in multiple incidents throughout the night, including spinning out on the last lap after contact with Ty Gibbs.

By mid-September, Deegan had expressed frustration with ARCA's limited practice and lack of live pit stops due to the COVID-19 pandemic, saying it "favors the drivers who have been there forever" and makes it more difficult to attract sponsorship. She also called the quality of the racing in ARCA "boring" due to the field being spread out, arguing, "I think [what] we've been lacking a lot in the ARCA Series [is] good racing." She tied her career-best ARCA finish with a second-place run at the Illinois State Fairgrounds Racetrack, the series' only dirt race of the season. At the conclusion of the season, Deegan finished third in the point standings and claimed the series' Rookie of the Year award.

On October 7, 2020, DGR-Crosley announced that Deegan would make her NASCAR Gander RV & Outdoors Truck Series debut in the team's No. 17 Ford at Kansas. She finished one lap down in 16th, the best result in Truck Series history for a woman in a series debut.

2021: Full-time in Truck Series

On October 17, 2020, Ford Performance announced that Deegan was in line to drive full-time in the 2021 NASCAR Camping World Truck Series for DGR-Crosley, which was renamed David Gilliland Racing in January. Deegan's truck number, No. 1, was revealed on January 18, 2021.

In August, she finished seventh at World Wide Technology Raceway at Gateway. Besides being her first Truck Series career top ten, she became the first woman in series history to score such a finish outside of a superspeedway.

She ended the season with the Gateway top ten and a 17th-place points finish. Due to many races not having practice and qualifying as part of COVID-19 pandemic restrictions, Deegan regarded her rookie season as a "learning experience" in growing accustomed to life in the Truck Series. She also regarded her social media presence as a boon in her racing development as her popularity provided patience among sponsors. She was voted the 2021 Truck Series Most Popular Driver, marking the second straight season that a rookie received the award after Zane Smith did so in 2020.

2022: Xfinity Series debut
On October 4, 2022, Deegan announced she would make her NASCAR Xfinity Series debut in the SS-Green Light Racing No. 07 at Las Vegas. She finished on the lead lap in 13th, the best result in Xfinity Series history for a woman in a series debut.

IMSA
Deegan's move to Ford in 2020 included a foray into the IMSA Michelin Pilot Challenge with Multimatic Motorsports. She ran the 2020 series season-opener at Daytona with co-driver Chase Briscoe. Deegan and Briscoe finished 43rd out of 51 cars. The pair's No. 22 Ford GT4 ran as high as 15th but developed mechanical problems about three hours into the four-hour event. Deegan returned to the series at Laguna Seca, teaming in the No. 22 Ford with Sebastian Priaulx.

In 2022, she returned to the Michelin Pilot Challenge at Daytona, once again sharing a car with Briscoe. The pair placed 24th in the field of 48.

Superstar Racing Experience
In 2021, Deegan joined the newly formed Superstar Racing Experience. She finished second to Tony Stewart in her first race at Knoxville Raceway, which was followed by starts at Slinger Speedway and Nashville Fairgrounds Speedway as a replacement for Tony Kanaan. The Slinger race was highlighted by a feud with Paul Tracy in which the two spun each other before arguing on Instagram.

She returned to SRX in 2022 for the Stafford Motor Speedway and I-55 Raceway rounds.

Driving style
Known for her aggressive on-track moves, all three of Deegan's wins in the K&N Pro Series West came after making contact with another car, while her last one saw her spin out her teammate entirely. Racers Kelly Crandall wrote in 2019, "Deegan doesn't care what anyone on or off the track thinks, and she has repeatedly made it clear she's here to win races, will do so at any cost, and then climb out and tell you all about it. Deegan has embraced her reputation as an aggressive driver, attributing it to her family's roots in motocross.

At Roseville in 2018, one week after scoring her first career victory on a bump-and-run pass, Deegan was penalized one lap late in the race for contact with Trevor Huddleston. In 2019, driving in her ARCA debut at Toledo, Deegan finished last after contact with Joe Graf Jr. and declared she was "done playing nice." Deegan's rough driving in the K&N West race at Gateway led to an argument with series veteran Todd Souza. Souza stated that her on-track behavior was "full-on disrespect" and was quoted as saying Deegan "drives like she's a spoiled rotten little baby."

In the 2020 season-opening ARCA race at Daytona, Deegan's aggressive bump drafting nearly spun teammate Tanner Gray into the tri-oval. Despite her spotter, Eric Holmes, encouraging her to relax the aggression, Deegan later sent Chuck Hiers into the wall coming off of turn 2, leading Autoweeks Matt Weaver to write, "Such drafting tactics are generally disapproved of at Daytona and Talladega, and that's something she will have to learn." Later that season at Lebanon I-44 Speedway, series officials gave Deegan a warning for her rough driving after she spun out two cars within the first 70 laps of the race. The second incident involved owner-driver Bret Holmes, who was spun as he and Deegan battled for the lead. Holmes said after the race, "Some drivers just don't understand what it's like to run your own team and have to pay for their own stuff, so they just...knock people out of the way every time they have to take the lead."

Personal life
Deegan is the daughter of Brian Deegan, a motocross rider, off-road racer, and former X Games athlete. Her younger brothers Haiden and Hudson have also competed in motocross. Deegan is in a relationship with dirt track racer and former NASCAR driver Chase Cabre. Cabre served as her co-driver in the 2022 Mint 400.

She attended Rancho Christian High School in her hometown of Temecula, California. Deegan currently splits time between her two residences in California and Mooresville, North Carolina.

Politics
At the 2020 Daytona 500, Deegan expressed interest in meeting President Donald Trump, tweeting the morning of the race, "Today's goal. Get my helmet signed by Trump." Trump's son, Donald Trump Jr., also attended the race and connected Deegan with President Trump, leading him to sign Deegan's helmet and pose for pictures with her.

Controversies
In September 2020, Deegan was criticized when comments surfaced from an audio podcast in which she called the COVID-19 pandemic a "hoax." On January 10, 2021, she again attracted criticism for using an ableist slur during an iRacing livestream on her Twitch channel. Deegan subsequently apologized after video of the incident was posted to social media. The next day, NASCAR announced that Deegan would be required to take sensitivity training prior to the start of the 2021 season.

Philanthropy
For Thanksgiving in 2020, Deegan partnered with Ford to deliver 3,325 pounds of turkey to families in Detroit. The amount of weight was the maximum payload rating of the new 2021 Ford F-150. During the Christmas holiday season the following month, Deegan partnered with fellow Ford driver Joey Logano to deliver hams and facemasks to North Carolina-based foundations.

Motorsports career results

Career summary

Off-road

Asphalt

NASCAR
(key) (Bold – Pole position awarded by qualifying time. Italics – Pole position earned by points standings or practice time. * – Most laps led.)

Xfinity Series

Craftsman Truck Series

 Season still in progress
 Ineligible for series points

K&N Pro Series West

ARCA Menards Series
(key) (Bold – Pole position awarded by qualifying time. Italics – Pole position earned by points standings or practice time. * – Most laps led.)

ARCA Menards Series East

Superstar Racing Experience
(key) * – Most laps led. 1 – Heat 1 winner. 2 – Heat 2 winner.

 SRX combines points from Deegan and Tony Kanaan.

References

External links

 
 

Living people
2001 births
Sportspeople from Temecula, California
Racing drivers from California
NASCAR drivers
ARCA Menards Series drivers
American female racing drivers
NASCAR controversies
21st-century American women
Multimatic Motorsports drivers
Michelin Pilot Challenge drivers
California Republicans